John Morgan (4 January 1671 – 7 March 1720) was a Welsh politician  who sat in the House of Commons from 1701 to 1720.

Morgan was the youngest son of William Morgan and his wife (and cousin) Blanche. When his elder brother Sir Thomas Morgan died without surviving children in 1700, he inherited the family's Tredegar Estate, the two middle brothers having predeceased him. 

Morgan, a strong Whig, entered the House of Commons as Member of Parliament for Monmouthshire in 1701, replacing his brother, and represented it until his death in 1720.
 He was created custos rotulorum of the county the same year, in succession to his brother.

In 1715, Morgan inherited Rhiwperra Castle and the manor of Gwynllwg from his uncle, John Morgan and obtained the lord lieutenancy of the county and also of Brecknockshire.

By his wife Martha Vaughan, Morgan had two sons, Sir William Morgan, upon whom he settled the Tredegar estate, and Thomas Morgan, upon whom he settled Rhiwpera. He also had a daughter, Martha, who married the 3rd Earl of Oxford. He died in 1720, and was buried on 19 March 1720 at Machen.

References

1671 births
1720 deaths
British MPs 1707–1708
British MPs 1708–1710
British MPs 1710–1713
British MPs 1713–1715
British MPs 1715–1722
Lord-Lieutenants of Brecknockshire
Lord-Lieutenants of Monmouthshire
Members of the Parliament of Great Britain for Welsh constituencies
Whig (British political party) MPs for Welsh constituencies
English MPs 1701
English MPs 1701–1702
English MPs 1702–1705
English MPs 1705–1707